The state parks of New South Wales are 18 protected areas in New South Wales, Australia reserved for camping, water sports and recreational uses. State parks are maintained by the New South Wales Department of Lands and managed by community trust boards.

They are:
Bellinger Heads State Park, near Coffs Harbour at the mouth of the Bellinger and Kalang Rivers.
Belmont State Park, Lake Macquarie (or Belmont Wetlands),  of wetlands and dunes, established as a state park in 2005.
Burrinjuck Waters State Park (officially Burrinjuck State Recreation Area) , near Yass,  of bushland on the southern escarpment of Mount Barren Jack.
Coffs Coast State Park (officially Coffs Coast Regional Park) , near Coffs Harbour  .
Copeton Waters State Park (officially Copeton State Recreation Area)   near Armidale,  on the southern shore of Copeton Dam on the Gwydir River
Cronulla State Park.
Goolawah State Park, near Crescent Head.
Grabine Lakeside State Park, near Bigga, near Wyangala Dam.
Harrington Beach State Park,  of ocean beaches adjoining Crowdy Head.
Jervis Bay State Park.
It was named for Edward Killelea, a previous owner. It used to be a dairy farm. It is situated on the southern part of Bass Point, a peninsula south of Shellharbour. It includes a lagoon, Killalea Lagoon, two popular surfing beaches that are part of a national surfing reserve and camping grounds. The two beaches are called Mystics and The Farm, also known as Minnamurra and Killalea respectively. The reserve's southern extremity is the northern side of the entrance to the Minnamurra River. It also incorporates Stack Island, a small rocky island just offshore from the entrance.
Lake Burrendong State Park,   near Dubbo,  near Mumbil on the southwestern shore of Lake Burrendong.
Lake Glenbawn State Park (officially Lake Glenbawn State Recreation Area) , in the Upper Hunter Valley.
Lake Keepit State Park (officially Lake Keepit State Recreation Area) , between Tamworth and Narrabri,   on Lake Keepit and the Namoi River.
Living Desert State Park, near Broken Hill.
Manning Entrance State Park,  of ocean beaches on the Manning River.
Wallaga Lake State Park .
Wyangala Waters State Park ,  near Cowra.

See also
Protected areas of New South Wales
State parks of Victoria, the only other state parks in Australia

References

External links
State parks information at the Department of Lands website

Lists of tourist attractions in New South Wales

Lists of parks in Australia